Bodwyn, Llanrhuddlad is a hamlet in the community of Cylch-y-Garn, Ynys Môn, Wales, which is  from Cardiff and  from London.

See also
List of localities in Wales by population

Villages in Anglesey